Major General Comte Jean de Rochambeau is a bronze statue by Fernand Hamar which honors Jean-Baptiste Donatien de Vimeur, comte de Rochambeau, a French nobleman and general who played a major role in helping the Thirteen Colonies win independence during the American Revolution.

It is located in Lafayette Park, Washington, D.C.
President Theodore Roosevelt dedicated the statue on May 24, 1902.
 
The inscription reads:

A copy of the statue exists in Paris at the Place Rochambeau.

As part of the American Revolution Statuary in Washington, D.C. the statue is listed on the National Register of Historic Places.

See also
 List of public art in Washington, D.C., Ward 2

References

External links

 Unveiling Rochambeau Statue, Washington D.C., 1902
 Rochambeau Statue, DCMemorialist.com

1902 sculptures
Rochambeau
Bronze sculptures in Washington, D.C.
Historic district contributing properties in Washington, D.C.
Liberty symbols
Lafayette Square, Washington, D.C.